Hartzell is an unincorporated community in New Madrid County, in the U.S. state of Missouri.

History
A post office called Hartzell was established in 1918, and remained in operation until 1941. The community has the name of the local Hartzell family.

References

Unincorporated communities in New Madrid County, Missouri
Unincorporated communities in Missouri